or  (or unofficially: Herjangen) is a fjord that branches off of the Ofotfjorden in Narvik Municipality in Nordland county, Norway. The villages along the fjord are Bjerkvik and Herjangen. The European route E06 and European route E10 highways run along the northern and eastern shores of the fjord.

References

Fjords of Nordland
Narvik